William O'Neal Ferrell (born November 6, 1913), nicknamed "Red", is an American former Negro league pitcher who played between 1937 and 1943.

A native of Empire, Alabama, Ferrell made his Negro leagues debut in 1937 with the Birmingham Black Barons. He went on to play with the Jacksonville Red Caps, Cleveland Bears, and Homestead Grays, and finished his career with a three-year stint with the Chicago American Giants from 1941 to 1943.

References

External links
 and Seamheads

1913 births
Birmingham Black Barons players
Chicago American Giants players
Cleveland Bears players
Homestead Grays players
Jacksonville Red Caps players
Baseball players from Alabama
People from Walker County, Alabama
Baseball pitchers
Year of death missing